Love, Death & Dancing is the second studio album by British singer-songwriter and musician Jack Garratt. It was released on 12 June 2020 through Island Records as the follow-up to his 2016 debut album Phase.

Background
After finishing touring his debut album Phase towards the end of 2016, he began working and writing material with other artists, such as Kacy Hill and Katy Perry and, into 2017, Jack recorded an albums worth of new material, which he ultimately scrapped, saying that "It was trash. It was awful. It was all bad. I wasn't willing to accept myself in that moment, so I wasn't willing to have a good idea." He then took time off to deal with the anxiety and self-doubt that he was feeling as a result of the attention and scrutiny that had come with the success and awards for his previous album. He then met with record producer Jacknife Lee, and together they began working on recording new music.

Release and promotion
On 6 February 2020, his new single "Time" premiered as the "Hottest Record" on Annie Mac's Future Sounds show on BBC Radio 1. The song features as the opening track on his new extended play Love, Death and Dancing (Vol. 1) which was released on the same day., containing the tracks "Mara" and "Return Them to the One". This EP makes up part of Garratt's second album Love, Death and Dancing, released on 12 June 2020.

Track listing
The album's twelve tracks appear in a different order depending on the listening medium. On the physical releases (vinyl, CD and cassette), they are arranged to convey the narrative of Garratt's life between the releases of Phase and Love, Death & Dancing, whereas on streaming services, they are sorted into four volumes of three tracks each, which are designed as "curated glances of the album as a whole".

Physical tracklist

Streaming tracklist

Notes
  signifies a co-record producer.
  signifies an additional producer.

Personnel

 Jack Garratt – production, vocals, programming, mastering, vocal arrangement, engineering
 Jacknife Lee – production, co-production, engineering, keyboards, programming
 David Wrench – mixing, programming
 Matt Bishop – engineering
 James Flannigan – production, programming, engineering
 Heba Kadry – mastering
 Brett Cox – vocal engineering

Charts

References

2020 albums
Island Records albums
Jack Garratt albums
Albums postponed due to the COVID-19 pandemic